Alan Lawson (born 19 May 1948, in Kirkcaldy) is a former Scotland international rugby union player.

Rugby Union career

Amateur career

He played for Edinburgh Wanderers. Lawson stated: 'When I played in the 1970s, Jimmy Thain, the head groundsman, regularly let us play on the international pitch, telling us: The pitch also has to be match fit.'

Lawson played for Heriots.

In the late 1970s he moved to London Scottish.

Provincial career

He was capped by Edinburgh District. Unusually, he was capped by Scotland before he was capped by a District side.

When he moved to London Scottish he represented Anglo-Scots and Middlesex County.

International career

He played scrum-half for Scotland on 15 occasions between 1972 and 1980. He made his test debut for Scotland against France at Murrayfield on 15 January 1972 and he played his last match for Scotland against Wales at Cardiff on 1 March 1980.

Administrative career

Lawson became the 123rd President of the Scottish Rugby Union. He served a one-year term from 2012 to 2013.

Family

He is married to Linda, the daughter of rugby commentator Bill McLaren. The couple have three children: Rory, who is also a Scotland rugby union international; Gregor, a Scotland 7s international and entrepreneur founding fancy dress company Morphsuits; and a daughter Lindsay.

References

1948 births
Living people
Edinburgh Wanderers RFC players
London Scottish F.C. players
Middlesex County RFU players
Presidents of the Scottish Rugby Union
Rugby union players from Kirkcaldy
Rugby union scrum-halves
Scotland international rugby union players
Scottish Exiles (rugby union) players
Scottish rugby union players